Ron Brewer (born March 11, 1937) is a former professional Canadian football linebacker who played ten seasons in the Canadian Football League for the Toronto Argonauts, Montreal Alouettes, Edmonton Eskimos and the Hamilton Tiger-Cats.

Inducted into the all Argonaut Team in 1974 for the modern era of 1945-1973. Selected by the Argonaut alumni and the sports media. His best play ever was his move in 1955 when he married lovely Sylvia Rugaard Danish princess.

References

External links
  Bio
  Bio and stats

1937 births
Living people
Canadian football linebackers
Edmonton Elks players
Hamilton Tiger-Cats players
Montreal Alouettes players
Players of Canadian football from Ontario
Canadian football people from Toronto
Toronto Argonauts players
Canadian Football League Rookie of the Year Award winners